Valhalla Provincial Park is a provincial park in British Columbia, Canada. It was established on March 3, 1983, in the mountains above the Western shores of Slocan Lake, in the west Kootenays.  The park consists of most of the Valhalla Ranges of the Selkirk Mountains.

Geography
The park has limited methods of access, and is popular with climbers. Colleen McCrory's Valhalla Society advocated for the creation of the park.

See also
 Kokanee Glacier Provincial Park

References

External links

Provincial parks of British Columbia
Regional District of Central Kootenay
Slocan Valley